Michael Lawrence Yarmush (born June 19, 1982) is an American-Canadian actor. He is known for providing the original voice of Arthur Read in the PBS children's animated television series Arthur.

Early life
Yarmush was born in Miami, Florida, the son of Daniel and Diane Yarmush.

Career
He was the very first voice actor of Arthur Read for the first five seasons of the TV series, and Arthur's Perfect Christmas. Since his voice became too deep to perform the title character's voice, Yarmush later played the recurring voice role of the Tough Customer member named Slink starting with the ninth season of the show. Twenty-two years after his departure from the role, he provided the voice of the adult Arthur in the series finale.

In 2007, he became a voice actor in the animated series Tripping The Rift, where he had the opportunity to use his voice for various characters in the series. He won a Young Artist Award in 1998 for the television series My Life as a Dog, and a Young Star Award in 1999 for his work in Arthur.

He currently resides in Montreal, Quebec.

Filmography

Film

Television

References

External links
 

1982 births
Arthur (TV series)
Living people
20th-century American male actors
20th-century Canadian male actors
21st-century American male actors
21st-century Canadian male actors
American expatriates in Canada
American male child actors
American male film actors
American male television actors
American male voice actors
Canadian male child actors
Canadian male film actors
Canadian male television actors
Canadian male voice actors
Canadian people of American descent
Male actors from Miami
Male actors from Montreal